Gustav Ernst Hans Jendretzky (20 July 1897 – 2 July 1992) was a German Communist politician. He was a prominent politician of the Socialist Unity Party (SED) in the German Democratic Republic (East Germany).

He became a member of the Independent Social Democratic Party of Germany in 1919 and of the Communist Party of Germany (KPD) in 1920. In the 1920s, he was one of the most prominents members of the KPD, and was head of the Roter Frontkämpferbund in Berlin. He was a member of the Parliament of Prussia from 1928 to 1932. In 1934, he was sentenced to three years of prison, being charged with "conspiracy to commit high treason."

After World War II, he became active in communist politics in the Soviet Occupation Zone, and was president of the Free German Trade Union Federation (FDGB) 1946-1948, First Secretary (head) of the East Berlin SED district from 1948 to 1953. He was a candidate to the politburo from 1950, deputy minister of the Interior from 1957 to 1960, a member of the SED central committee 1957-1989, member of the Volkskammer 1950-1954 and 1958-1989.

Jendretzky famously denounced the Freedom Bell in western Berlin, a gift from Americans as a sign of the fight against communism in Europe, as the "death bell", warning: "The rope of the death bell will become the gallows rope for those who ring it."

Literature 
Hermann Weber/Andreas Herbst: Deutsche Kommunisten. Biographisches Handbuch 1918 bis 1945, Berlin: Karl Dietz Verlag 2004, S. 344-345

References

External links 
 

1897 births
1992 deaths
Politicians from Berlin
Independent Social Democratic Party politicians
Communist Party of Germany politicians
Candidate members of the Politburo of the Central Committee of the Socialist Unity Party of Germany
Members of the Provisional Volkskammer
Members of the 1st Volkskammer
Members of the 3rd Volkskammer
Members of the 4th Volkskammer
Members of the 5th Volkskammer
Members of the 6th Volkskammer
Members of the 7th Volkskammer
Members of the 8th Volkskammer
Members of the 9th Volkskammer
Free German Trade Union Federation members
Rotfrontkämpferbund members
Recipients of the Patriotic Order of Merit (honor clasp)